The following lists prisoner of war populations in the continental United States during World War II.

Notes

References

World War II prisoners of war held by the United States
United States history-related lists